The Ordinary Boys is the self-titled fourth studio album by The Ordinary Boys released on 2 October 2015. The album spawned the singles "Awkward" and "Four Letter Word". It was produced by Rory Attwell of Test Icicles and Matt Johnson of Hookworms.

Track listing
"About Tonight"
"Awkward"
"Four Letter Word"
"I'm Leaving You (And I'm Taking You with Me)"
"Losing My Cool"
"Cruel"
"Panic Attack"
"Do or Die"
"Almost Ready"
"Putting My Heart on the Line"
"Disposable Anthem"
"Heard You Wanna Beat Me Up" (Bonus Track)
"Creep on Me" (Bonus Track)

Personnel
Samuel Preston – vocals, rhythm guitar
Louis Jones – lead guitar, additional vocals
James Gregory – bass
Charles "Chuck" Stanley – drums

2015 albums
The Ordinary Boys albums